Two in a Car (German: Zwei in einem Auto) is a 1932 German comedy film directed by Joe May and starring Karl Ludwig Diehl, Magda Schneider and Richard Romanowsky. It was shot at the Joinville Studios of Pathé-Natan in Paris with sets designed by the art directors Heinrich Richter and Hermann Warm. It premiered at the Gloria-Palast in Berlin. A separate French version Companion Wanted was also released. In 1940 the film was remade at the Cinecitta studios in Rome as Two on a Vacation.

Cast
 Karl Ludwig Diehl as Lord Kingsdale
 Magda Schneider as Lisa Krüger
 Richard Romanowsky as Oberbuchhalter Broesecke
 Ernö Verebes 
 Kurt Gerron as Agent Niedlich
 Heinz Gordon as Chauffeur Meyer 
 Max Nadler as Gemütlicher Matthias

References

Bibliography 
 Bock, Hans-Michael & Bergfelder, Tim. The Concise Cinegraph: Encyclopaedia of German Cinema. Berghahn Books, 2009.

External links 
 

1932 films
Films of the Weimar Republic
German comedy films
1932 comedy films
1930s German-language films
Films directed by Joe May
German multilingual films
Films produced by Joe May
Films scored by Bruno Granichstaedten
German black-and-white films
1932 multilingual films
1930s German films
Films shot at Joinville Studios